Ludhiana Lok Sabha constituency (S. No. 7) is one of the 13 Lok Sabha (parliamentary) constituencies in Punjab, India. This Lok Sabha constituency is composed of 9 Punjab Legislative Assembly Constituencies from Ludhiana district, which are given further in the table. The incumbent MP is Ravneet Singh Bittu from Indian National Congress, who won consecutively two times from this Lok Sabha constituency in 2014 & 2019 Indian general elections.

Punjab Legislative Assembly segments

Members of Parliament

Election results

General elections 2019

General elections 2014

General elections 2009

See also
 Ludhiana district
 List of Constituencies of the Lok Sabha

Notes

External links
Ludhiana lok sabha  constituency election 2019 result details

Lok Sabha constituencies in Punjab, India
Ludhiana district